Casandra Elizabeth Ventura (born August 26, 1986), known professionally as Cassie, is an American singer, songwriter, model, actress and dancer. Born in New London, Connecticut, she began her career as a result of meeting record producer Ryan Leslie in late 2004, who later signed her to NextSelection Lifestyle Group. During this time, Diddy heard "Me & U" in a club, and Leslie convinced him to partner his Bad Boy Records with Leslie's NextSelection imprint for the release of her debut album.

Cassie's self titled debut studio album was released in August 2006, peaking at number four on the Billboard 200 chart and features the Billboard Hot 100 top three hit "Me & U". In 2008, Cassie released the single "Official Girl" (featuring Lil Wayne). In 2009, she released the singles "Must Be Love" (featuring Diddy), and "Let's Get Crazy" (featuring Akon), and signed a record deal with Interscope Records. In April 2013, Cassie released her debut mixtape RockaByeBaby, which was promoted with the music videos of "Numb" (featuring Rick Ross) and "Paradise" (featuring Wiz Khalifa).

Apart from music, Cassie is signed to modeling agency Wilhelmina Models and One Management. Cassie has modeled for Calvin Klein one and has been featured in magazines including GQ and Bust and becoming the face of ASOS 2013 spring collection, Cassie has appeared in adverts for Delia's, Adidas, Abercrombie & Fitch, Seventeen, and a commercial for Clean and Clear. Cassie has also ventured into acting; she made her film debut in Step Up 2: The Streets (2008).

Early life
Cassie Ventura was born in 1986 in New London, Connecticut, the daughter of a mother of African-American, Mexican and West Indian descent and a Filipino father. She attended the Williams School, a preparatory school, located on the Connecticut College campus. At age 14 Cassie began modeling and by 16 was modeling for local department stores, Delia's fashion catalog and Seventeen. Cassie also briefly appeared in R&B singer Mario's "Just a Friend 2002" music video. Encouraged by producer Rockwilder, Cassie took vocal lessons, modern ballet, as well as using her school's performing arts program. Cassie finished high school in 2004 and then moved to New York City, where she returned to modeling and classes at the Broadway Dance Center. She began booking print and commercial modeling gigs and being represented by Wilhelmina Models.

Career

2004–2007: Cassie

Ryan Leslie spotted Cassie at clubs and parties in late 2004 frequently. The two wrote a duet called "Kiss Me", and after recording the track, Leslie played the song for music executive Tommy Mottola. Mottola offered Cassie a management deal, and Leslie signed her to NextSelection Lifestyle Group, his music-media company he founded with online marketing partner Rasheed Richmond. Leslie wrote and produced Cassie's first single, "Me & U", in 2005. The song became a club hit in Germany. During this time, Diddy heard "Me & U" in a club, and Leslie convinced him to partner his Bad Boy Records with Leslie's NextSelection imprint for the release of Cassie's debut album.

Ryan Leslie produced most of the album, which is a mix of R&B/hip hop/pop. Ventura said in an interview, "I rap, I sing, I do my R&B, I do my slow songs and stuff that the girls will love, I have a down South joint, I have a rock song that I did with my girls this band called Pretty Boys." She paid tribute to her Filipino culture by incorporating OPM sounds into some of the ballads.
The album, Cassie, was released on August 8, 2006 and sold 321,000 copies in the United States. The album's lead single "Me & U" peaked at number three on the Billboard Hot 100, selling more than 1 million digital downloads. To promote her album, Cassie performed on Total Request Live and 106 & Park: BET's Top 10 Live. Her performances were described as "rocky" and "less-than-stellar", but Diddy said that it was due to her inexperience. He said that he would be "with her through her development", and that he has no "question on her ability [to sing]". Cassie addressed the events on her MySpace page, saying that she is aware that her performances were "pretty bad", and that she was "still getting over stage fright".

MTV News reported in June 2007 that contrary to rumors, Cassie had not been dropped from Bad Boy Records after releasing two singles from her self-titled debut album. Diddy said that she was in the studio working with producers Kanye West and Pharrell Williams on her second album. It was also reported that Cassie was no longer collaborating with Ryan Leslie, who had produced the majority of her debut album. However, the singer later stated that she was open to collaborating with Leslie again. According to Bad Boy A&R Daniel 'Skid' Mitchell, rather than largely relying on the one songwriter-producer, the new album's mix of writers and producers, as well as her own co-write input, makes it a more personal record for her.
Additional production on the album came from Seven and LV, as well as Diddy himself. Cassie said that she had also collaborated with Akon, The Neptunes, Danja, Eric Hudson, The Surf Club and Rob Holiday, although she was not sure which tracks were going to be included on the album. Commenting on the number of producers on the album, Cassie said that she "collaborated with a lot of different producers and a lot of different writers, which was an amazing opportunity for me, because on my first album, one producer [Ryan Leslie] straight through...which was fun, but it was nice to experience other people."

2008–2013: Acting debut and RockaByeBaby

In 2008, Cassie made her film debut as Sophie Donovan in the dance film Step Up 2: The Streets, Cassie also sang the lead single "Is It You" to the Step Up soundtrack. The song was released on November 13, 2007, and peaked at eighty-five on the Canadian Hot 100 and fifty-two in the United Kingdom.
In July 2009, Cassie announced that her second studio album's title would be Electro Love. Cassie said that her new album will demonstrate more "independence"; there will be a "difference in vocals, a little bit more personality. And it's definitely a sensual album".
Three singles have been released from the album; "Official Girl" featuring Lil Wayne in August 2008, "Must Be Love" featuring Diddy in April 2009, and "Let's Get Crazy" featuring Akon in August 2009. All three singles failed to chart in the United States.

After several delays, it was announced in December 2009 that Cassie had signed a new record deal with Interscope Records. She is featured in a spread in the August/September issue of Bust in which she said a new single will be released in the fall. She has recently told her Twitter followers that she is still in the studio recording for her album. At the time of an October 2010 interview with HitQuarters, A&R Daniel 'Skid' Mitchell said that Cassie had already recorded around fifty songs for the album. Mitchell said that she was taking her time over the album because she is keen for "it to be something that people are going to respect". She also appeared in rapper Wiz Khalifa's "Roll Up" music video as his love interest.

Cassie released the single, "King of Hearts", which was released in the United States on February 14, 2012, along with the official music video. On April 24, 2012, Cassie performed the single live for the first time at BET's 106 & Park music video show. She concluded the performance with a brief dance number set to the Kanye West remix of the song, along with four dancers. After the performance Cassie and 106 & Park were worldwide trending topics on Twitter and it received mostly mixed to positive reviews from various online media outlets. The single, "Balcony", featuring Young Jeezy, was then sent to U.S. urban radio stations on September 18, 2012.
On September 13, 2012, Nicki Minaj released the debut single off her re-release album Pink Friday: Roman Reloaded – The Re-Up, titled "The Boys", featuring Cassie. The song was then sent to urban radios on September 25 and a music video was released on October 18.

In July 2012, Cassie announced in a letter to her fans that she had been working simultaneously on her album and a new mixtape titled RockaByeBaby.
RockaByeBaby was released on April 11, 2013, and was named the best mixtape of the year by Dazed & Confused.
The mixtape saw the release of "Numb" featuring American rapper Rick Ross on April 2, along with the song's accompanying music video and "Paradise" featuring rapper Wiz Khalifa premiered on April 9, 2013 alongside the video on BET 106 & Park.
In April 2013 it was announced that Cassie was the face of the Summer 2013 Forever 21 collection.

2016–present: Second studio album and other endeavors
In March 2015, Cassie's boyfriend, rapper Diddy announced he would return to producing and revealed he would be producing songs for Cassie's second studio album. In 2016 it was announced Cassie would return to acting, playing the lead role in the romantic comedy The Perfect Match. Released on March 11, 2016, the Billie Woodruff directed film, stars Cassie alongside Terrence J who plays Charlie, a successful playboy who doesn't believe in love until he crosses paths with the sexy Eva (Cassie). In late 2017, she released the singles "Love a Loser" featuring American rapper G-Eazy and "Don't Play It Safe."

In January 2019, after ending her relationship with Diddy and leaving Bad Boy Records, Cassie entered the studio with the likes of producers Chris n Teeb and singer-songwriter Ro James. Throughout Summer 2019, Cassie released several singles -- "Moments" with The Code, "Excuses," "Hungover," "Don't Let Go," "Speaking Of," "Rollercoaster" featuring Ro James, "Teach Me" and "Simple Things"—via her own Ventura Music label. The series of releases was dubbed "Free Fridays" by Cassie and serve as a teaser ahead of the release of her long-awaited second album.

Artistry and public image

Cassie's musical sound is R&B, pop, and hip hop soul. Her voice has "character and ability". Cassie cites Aaliyah, Jennifer Lopez, Christina Aguilera, Madonna, Stevie Wonder, Nine Inch Nails, Britney Spears, La Lupe, Mariah Carey, Faith Evans and Usher as musical influences. Cassie also refers to herself as a "die-hard Janet Jackson fan", continuing to say "I'd love to emulate Janet Jackson's career—totally, Janet Jackson is an incredible and fantastic, from her moves to her voice". Cassie debut album was R&B and pop rock with urban and contemporary R&B styles, the album contained "looming synthesizer patterns" and "ice-cream-truck melody to give it a slightly twisted and threatening edge", as well as containing "flippant playfulness".
RockaByeBaby is an R&B and hip hop mixtape that featured "dark" and a "raw, laid back vibe".

Cassie is known for being a style icon due to her "edgy style" and "feminine" and "sophisticated" fashion. Cassie is also known for setting the trend among women of shaving their hair, after Cassie shaved hers in 2009 influenced by punk. She has cited Kate Moss as her style influence.

Personal life
Cassie was in a long-term relationship with Sean Combs from 2007 to 2018.

Cassie entered into a relationship with fitness trainer Alex Fine in late 2018. In June 2019, she and Fine announced that they were expecting their first child together. In August 2019, they announced their engagement. The following month it was reported the couple had married. Their wedding video, posted by Fine on his verified Instagram account, revealed their wedding date as August 28, 2019. In October 2019, their wedding photos were published on Vogues official website. On December 6, 2019, the couple's first daughter was born. In December 2020, she and Fine announced that they were expecting their second child. The couple's second daughter was born on March 22, 2021.

Discography

 Cassie (2006)

Filmography

Awards and nominations

References

Further reading

External links

 
 

1986 births
Living people
Actresses from Connecticut
20th-century African-American women singers
American dance musicians
Female models from Connecticut
American women pop singers
American contemporary R&B singers
Bad Boy Records artists
American musicians of Filipino descent
American musicians of Mexican descent
American women hip hop singers
American women hip hop musicians
American female models
Hispanic and Latino American actresses
Singers from Connecticut
Musicians from New London, Connecticut

Filipino people of African-American descent
American models of Filipino descent
American people of West Indian descent
American film actresses
African-American actresses
21st-century American women singers
21st-century American singers
21st-century African-American women singers
American actresses of Mexican descent